The Wright State Raiders baseball team is the college baseball team of Wright State University. The program was founded in 1971 where it started off in Division II until 1988 when it moved to Division I. Nischwitz Stadium in Dayton, OH has been the home field of the program since 1993. The team has won 12 conference regular season championships, 12 conference tournament championships, and has appeared in the NCAA tournament 10 times.

Stadium
Wright State currently plays at Nischwitz Stadium. The 750 seat stadium was built in 1993 and was named after Ron and Gregg Nischwitz. Ron coached the program for 30 years.

Year-by-year results
WSU's records season by season since joining Division I in 1988.

Wright State in the NCAA tournament
Wright State has been in the NCAA tournament 11 times. The team last played in the NCAA tournament in 2022 after they defeated Oakland in the Horizon League tournament championship.

The NCAA Division I baseball tournament started in 1947.
The format of the tournament has changed through the years.

Notable Former players

Brian Anderson
Keith Gordon
Carlos Peña
Joe Smith
Robert Pollard
Sean Murphy

References

External links

 
Baseball teams established in 1971
1971 establishments in Ohio